Holy Holy may refer to:

 "Holy Holy" (song), a 1971 song by David Bowie
 Holy Holy (Australian band), an Australian indie rock band active from 2011
 Holy Holy (tribute band), a supergroup which performs the musical works of David Bowie

See also
 "Holy, Holy, Holy! Lord God Almighty", an 1861 Christian hymn written by Reginald Heber